Michael Kohnle (born 3 May 1970 in Göppingen, Baden-Württemberg) is a retired male decathlete from Germany. He set his personal best score (8302 points) in the men's decathlon on 28 May 1995 in Götzis. Kohnle was the last national champion for West Germany (1990).

Achievements

References

1970 births
Living people
People from Göppingen
Sportspeople from Stuttgart (region)
German decathletes
World Athletics Championships athletes for Germany